The Stupor Salesman is a Warner Bros. Looney Tunes cartoon, directed by Arthur Davis, and written by Lloyd Turner and Bill Scott. The cartoon was released on November 20, 1948, and stars Daffy Duck.

Mel Blanc performs the voices of Daffy Duck and Slug McSlug, an infamous bank robber.

Plot
Slug McSlug, a notorious criminal (and anthropomorphic dog) rides a green sedan to the Last National Bank. He gets out of the car, uses a bump key to unlock the door of the bank, and commits a successful robbery. Then radios announced the robbery and Slug McSlug is chased by police. 

During the chase, He paints his sedan yellow and finally reaches his country hideout. He is promptly visited by an uninvited Daffy Duck, who is a door-to-door salesman of a variety of items. McSlug slams the door in Daffy's face, but Daffy doggedly persists in his efforts to sell something to McSlug, raising the ire of the wanted criminal. McSlug hammers a fake foot by Daffy, who zaps McSlug with a joy buzzer. Daffy is evicted, but brings McSlug more confusion when he gets back inside via this time, in a helicopter ("Just a little device to gain entrance to where one is not exactly welcome."). 

McSlug throws Daffy out of the house again, but Daffy brings him even more confusion when he saws a hole and uses an elevator to gain entry and tells McSlug that he is not leaving until he sells him something. McSlug asks for brass knuckles and when he gets them, the bank robber prepares to punch Daffy, only to shatter them and hit his fist on an iron (Morse code is heard). McSlug opens fire on Daffy with a machine gun, who, conveniently, is wearing a sample of his company's bullet-proof vests. "Guaranteed to get your money back if it fails to work!" says Daffy. McSlug then tries to punch out Daffy, but he literally flies through the wall. 

In the dark, Daffy is looking for McSlug, and insults him, but when the lights turn on, he finds that he is looking at himself in the mirror, and Daffy, realizing that he is insulting his own reflection in the mirror at "Nincompoop", and McSlug, finally growing tired of his persistence and impudence, says, "Why, you!", and starts to chase after Daffy, but Daffy gets the drop on him again by having McSlug run into a brick wall. When Daffy turns on the gas of McSlug's stove to demonstrate the igniting power of his sample lighter, McSlug literally throws Daffy out and tries the lighter himself, which blows the hideout and McSlug sky-high.  The victorious Daffy yells toward the sky: "Hey, bub!  You need a house to go with this doorknob!!!"

Reception
Animation historian Mike Mallory writes, "There is not a wasted cel in The Stupor Salesman. At first glance, the story of a bank robber who cannot escape the diabolical persistence of door-to-door salesman Daffy Duck (at his stream-of-consciousness best) sounds like a conventional pest-vs.-threat cartoon, but it is not. The short zooms by with the insistent pacing of the early Warner Bros. gangster films it aggressively parodies. Rarely, if ever, has one seven-minute cartoon burst its seams so thoroughly with inventive sight gags, throwaway jokes, and visual details."

Home media
The Stupor Salesman can be found on the four-disc DVD box set Looney Tunes Golden Collection: Volume 5, as well as the similar, two-disc DVD Looney Tunes Spotlight Collection: Volume 5. It is also available on the "Superior Duck" VHS, and the "Guffaw and Order" laserdisc. It can also be found on Looney Tunes Golden Collection's superior DVD series Looney Tunes Platinum Collection On Volume 3.

See also
 List of Daffy Duck cartoons

References

External links
 

1948 animated films
1948 short films
1948 films
Looney Tunes shorts
Warner Bros. Cartoons animated short films
Films directed by Arthur Davis
Daffy Duck films
Films scored by Carl Stalling
1940s Warner Bros. animated short films
1940s English-language films
Films about bank robbery
Films about salespeople